Franck Goddio (born 1947 in Casablanca, Morocco) is a French underwater archaeologist who, in 2000, discovered the city of Thonis-Heracleion 7 km off the Egyptian shore in Aboukir Bay. He led the excavation of the submerged site of Canopus and of Antirhodos in the ancient harbour of Alexandria (Portus Magnus). He has also excavated ships in the waters of the Philippines, significantly the Spanish galleon San Diego.

Biography
Goddio received degrees in mathematics and statistics from the École Nationale de la Statistique et de l'Administration Économique in Paris. He was employed as an advisor to national and international organizations and various governments for over 15 years.

In the early 1980s he decided to focus on underwater archaeology. In 1987 he founded the Institut Européen d'Archéologie Sous-Marine (IEASM) in Paris.

In his work in detecting and recovering ancient shipwrecks and searching for the remains of sunken cities, Goddio developed a systematic approach to underwater archaeology. He has found or excavated over a dozen sunken ships of historic importance, which had been resting on the ocean bed for hundreds of years. Among them are junks dating from the 11th to the 15th centuries, the Spanish galleon San Diego and San José (1694), Napoleon Bonaparte's flagship Orient and two East Indiamen: Griffin (1761) and Royal Captain, lost in 1773.

Goddio adheres to strict archaeological standards during the exploration and excavation phases, and closely cooperates with national and local authorities, leading archaeological experts and institutions. In 2003, in co-operation with Oxford University, he helped to found the Oxford Centre for Maritime Archaeology (OCMA). In 2009 he was appointed a senior visiting lecturer in the School of Archaeology at Oxford University. In the same year he received the French Legion of Honour (Légion d'Honneur). In 2018, he became visiting professor in maritime archaeology at Oxford University.

Goddio's research projects have been financed by the Hilti Foundation since 1996. He has written several books and scientific articles, reporting on research projects and excavations. Several TV documentaries have also been produced and aired throughout the world. In addition, various exhibitions have presented the finds and made them accessible to a wide audience. The discovery of a cup inscribed with a reference (in Greek) to "Christ", dating from the 2nd century CE, received international publicity.

Expeditions
1986–1988: Griffin (1761) of the British East India Company
1987–1990: Spanish galleon San José (1694)
1990–1994: Spanish galleon San Diego (1600)
1996–2003: sunken royal quarters of Alexandria's eastern harbour, Egypt
1997: Royal Captain of the British East India Company
1997: junk of the Lena shoal with ceramics of the Ming dynasty
1998–1999: Napoleon's lost fleet from the  battle against Admiral Nelson in Aboukir Bay in 1798 and his flagship Orient
2000–2003: the sunken cities of Thônis–Heracleion and Canopus in Aboukir Bay, Egypt
2002: junk Santa Cruz with over 10,000 pieces of 15th-century porcelain
2003: French slave ship , lost in 1714 off the coast of Cuba
2004–present: researches and excavations of Egypt's coast in the Bay of Aboukir on the sites of Canopus and Thonis-Heracleion, finalisation of the topography of the sites, continuing excavation in Alexandria's Eastern Harbour

Exhibitions (selection)
Objects found during excavations directed by Goddio have enriched the national collection of countries where the excavations took place: the National Museum of the Philippines, the Museum of the Bibliotheca Alexandrina National Museum of Alexandria. In accordance with the antiquities authority in the Philippines, objects from Goddio's excavations were donated to the Museo Naval de Madrid, [Guimet Museum] (Musée des arts asiatiques-Guimet, France) and the Maritime Museum in Port Louis.

Goddio has also created travelling exhibitions to bring his discoveries to wide audiences:

Osiris. Egypt's Sunken Mysteries The exhibition presents artefacts drawn largely from the last seven years of underwater excavations at the ancient cities of Thonis-Heracleion and Canopus off the coast of Egypt by the European Institute for Underwater Archaeology (IEASM), directed by Franck Goddio in cooperation with the Egyptian Ministry for Antiquities and supported by the Hilti Foundation. The selection is supplemented by 40 artefacts from museums in Cairo and Alexandria. Displayed in Paris at the institut du monde arabe, Sept 2015 – March 2016; in London at the British Museum in a slightly different version under the title "Sunken cities. Egypt's lost worlds" May – November 2016, in Zurich at the Museum Rietberg, February – July 2017; in Saint Louis (MO, US) at the St Louis Arts Museum March–September 2018 and in Minneapolis (MN, US) at the Minneapolis Institute of Art, November 2018 – April 2019. In Los Angeles/Simi Valley at the Ronald Reagan Presidential Library and Museum, October 2019 - April 2020 and in Richmond  at the Virginia Museum of Fine Arts, Richmond (VA), July 2020 - January 2021.

Egypt's Sunken Treasures: A selection of some 500 artefacts  unearthed during the excavations in Aboukir Bay and the port of Alexandria. Presented in Berlin (April – September 2006), Paris (December 2006 – March 2007), Bonn (April 2007 – January 2008), Madrid (April – December 2008), Turin (February – May 2009) and Yokohama (June – September 2009).

Cleopatra, The Search for the Last Queen of Egypt A selection of 146 artefacts from Egypt's sunken treasures, displayed in the United States from 2010 to 2013, as part of the larger exhibition "Cleopatra,The Search for the Last Queen of Egypt" at the Franklin Institute in Philadelphia, at the Cincinnati Museum Center in Cincinnati, Ohio, at the Public Museum in Milwaukee, Wisconsin, and at the California Science Center in Los Angeles.

Treasures of the San Diego: An exhibition of the Spanish galleon, illustrating the work of the team: archivists, engineers, divers, archaeologists, scientists, illustrators, photographers and cameramen: Paris (September 1994 – January 1995), Madrid (May – October 1995), New York (November 1996 – February 1997), Berlin (June – Oct. 1997), Manille (February – April 1998).

Bibliography (selection)
Franck Goddio and Damian Robinson (Eds.), Constructing, Remaking and Dismantling Sacred Landscapes in Lower Egypt from the Late Dynastic to the Early Medieval Period, Oxford Centre for Maritime Archaeology, University of Oxford 2021, 
Sylvie Cauville and Franck Goddio, De la Stèle du Satrape (ligne14-15) au temple de Kom Ombo, in Göttinger Miszellen, Beiträge zur ägyptologischen Diskussion (Helft 253/2017, N° 950), p. 45-54.
Franck Goddio and Aurélia Masson-Berghoff, Sunken cities, Egypt's lost worlds, Thames & Hudson in cooperation with the British Museum, 2016, 
Franck Goddio and Damian Robinson (Eds.), Thonis-Heracleion in context, Oxford Centre for Maritime Archaeology, Oxford 2015, 
Franck Goddio u. David Fabre, "Osiris, Egypt's sunken Myteries", Paris 2015, 
Zahi Hawass and Franck Goddio, Cleopatra – The Search for the last Queen of Egypt, National Geographic, Washington D.C. 2010, 
Underwater Archaeology in the Canopic Region – The Topography and Excavation of Heracleion–Thonis and East Canopus (1996–2006), Oxford Centre for Maritime Archaeology, Oxford 2007, 
André Bernand and Franck Goddio, Sunken Egypt – Alexandria, Arcperiplus, London 2002, 
Franck Goddio ed., Egypt's Sunken Treasures, Prestel, Munich 2006, 
Peter Lam, Rosemary Scott, Stacey Pierson, Monique Crick, and Franck Goddio, Lost at Sea, Periplus Publishing, London 2002, 
Archaeological Survey of Alexandria's Eastern Harbour. In Underwater Archaeology and Coastal Management, Unesco Publishing 2000
Gabrielle Iltis, Franck Goddio et al., Royal Captain, Periplus Publishing, London 2000, 
Stacey Pierson, Monique Crick, and Franck Goddio, Sunken Treasures of the Lena Cargo, Periplus Publishing, London 2000, 
Evelyne Jay Guyot de Saint Michel and Franck Goddio, Griffin – On the Route of an Indiaman, Periplus Publishing, London 1999, 
André Bernard, Etienne Bernand, Jean Yoyotte, Franck Goddio et al., Alexandria, the Submerged Royal Quarters, Periplus Publishing, London 1998,

Documentaries
The Lost City of Canopus/ Cleopatra's Lost City, Channel 5/ Smithsonian Channel, 2021
Drain Egypt's Sunken City, National Geographic Channel US, May 2020
Cleopatra's Palace – In Search Of A Legend, Discovery Channel, 1999
Napoleon's Fleet, Discovery Channel, 1999
Treasures Of The Royal Captain, Discovery Channel, 2000
Sunken Cities, Ancient Earthquakes, Discovery Channel, 2001
Lost Temple To The Gods, Discovery Channel, 2003
Franck Goddio – In Search Of Sunken Treasures, Spiegel TV, 2006
Treasures of The San Diego, Rundfunk Berlin-Brandenburg 2007
Egypt's Sunken City – A Legend is Revealed, Arte/MDR, 2013
Swallowed by the Sea: Ancient Egypt's Greatest Lost City, BBC, UK, 2014
The Wonder List with Bill Weir, CNN October 2017
Inside Africa, CNN International, June 2018

References

External links

Franck Goddio YouTube Channel
Institut Européen d'Archéologie Sous-Marine (IEASM) official website
Hilti Foundation
Oxford Center for Maritime Archaeology (OCMA)
Franck Goddio lecture: The Portus Magnus of Alexandria  - 25 years of underwater archaeological research, University of Oxford Live, December 2021
Shipwrecks and Sunken Cities – an interview with Franck Goddio (Oxford University podcast series)
Could an ancient Nile Delta shipwreck be an environmental omen for modern-day Egypt?, Arab News, 23 July 2021
Fruit baskets from fourth century BC found in ruins of Thonis-Heracleion, The Guardian, 2 August 2021
Archaeological 'treasures,' including 2,400-year-old fruit, discovered at ancient Egyptian city, CNN, 3 August 2021
Sunken Egyptian treasures on show at the British Museum BBC London News
Exhibition at the Saint Louis Arts Museum: Sunken cities. Egypt's lost worlds Sunken Cities | Exhibitions
Exhibition at the Minneapolis Institute of art: Egypt's Sunken Cities Egypt's Sunken Cities –– Minneapolis Institute of Art
Exhibition at the Virginia Museum of Fine Arts, Richmond (VA) Treasures of Ancient Egypt: Sunken Cities 
Nile shipwreck discovery proves Herodotus right – after 2,469 years – The Guardian, March 2019
Egyptian treasures in the US – Ahram Online, July 2020
Divers Uncover Ancient Temple Submerged Within The 'Egyptian Atlantis' – Science Alert, August 2019
Ancient Egypt: Underwater Archaeologists Uncover Destroyed Temple in the Sunken City of Heracleion – Newsweek, July 2019
Inside Africa The secrets of a lost Egyptian city were underwater 
The Wall Street Journal, May 2016 Treasures From the Deep at the British Museum 
BBC Radio 4, March 2016 The BP exhibition Sunken Cities: Egypt's Lost Worlds  
Exhibition: Egypt's Sunken Treasures – Franck Goddio website

Huffington Post: Lost Egyptian City Revealed After 1,200 Years Under The Sea
Slate: Lost Ancient City Exhumed From the Ocean
BBC World Service: Discovering Cleopatra's Palace

1947 births
20th-century French archaeologists
21st-century French archaeologists
Living people
People from Casablanca
Underwater archaeologists